Wawn or WAWN may refer to:

People
Andrew Wawn (born 1944), British literary scholar
John Wawn (1801–1859), British politician
Vic Wawn (1882–1947), Australian rules footballer

Radio station
WAWN (FM), radio station (89.5 FM) in Franklin, Pennsylvania, United States